Jean Leon Gerome Ferris (August 8, 1863 – March 18, 1930) was an American painter best known for his series of 78 scenes from American history, entitled The Pageant of a Nation, the largest series of American historical paintings by a single artist.

Early life

Born in Philadelphia, Pennsylvania, Ferris was the son of Stephen James Ferris (1835-1915) : a portrait painter who was a devotee of Jean-Léon Gérôme (his teacher after whom he was named), and also an admirer of Mariano Fortuny. He grew up around art; he was trained by his father and his uncles Edward Moran and Thomas Moran were both acclaimed painters.

Ferris enrolled in the Pennsylvania Academy of the Fine Arts in 1879 and trained further at the Académie Julian beginning in 1883 under William-Adolphe Bouguereau. He also met his namesake Jean-Léon Gérôme, who greatly influenced his decision to paint scenes from American history. Ferris wrote, "[Gérôme's] axiom was that one would paint best that with which he is most familiar".

Career 
His early subjects were Orientalist in nature since that movement was in vogue when he was young. In 1882, he exhibited a painting entitled Feeding the Ibis which was valued at $600. By 1895, he had gained a reputation as a historical painter, and he embarked on his dream of creating a series of paintings that told a historical narrative.

In 1898, he sold General Howe's Levee, 1777, but he later realized that such a series could not be complete if the separate paintings could not be kept together. Consequently, he never sold another, but he did sell the reproduction rights to various publishing companies. This had the effect of greatly popularizing his work, as these companies made prints, postcards, calendars, and blank-backed trade cards to use in advertisements. Laminated cards of these works were still being sold as late as 1984.

Personal life 
Ferris married Annette Amelia Ryder in 1894, and the couple had a daughter named Elizabeth Mary. He died in Philadelphia, Pennsylvania in 1930 at age 66.

Legacy 
The paintings showed idealized portrayals of famous moments from American history. The complete series was shown at Independence Hall in Philadelphia from 1913 to 1930, then moved next door to Congress Hall. In later years, it was shown in a number of locations, including the Smithsonian Institution, before being returned to the Ferris family. His works were widely popular for many years, but modern critics are far less generous in their praise.

The American Philosophical Society claims that his historical paintings confuse "verity with verisimilitude", and art historian Gerald Ackerman describes them as "splendid in the accuracy of accessories, clothing and especially in the details of land conveyances and ships", but "extremely dry in execution and rather monotonous in composition."

References

External links

1863 births
1930 deaths
19th-century American painters
20th-century American painters
Académie Julian alumni
American male painters
Artists from Philadelphia
Orientalist painters
Pennsylvania Academy of the Fine Arts alumni
19th-century American male artists
20th-century American male artists